Lehtse Parish was a rural municipality of Estonia, in Järva County. The parish existed until 1950. The parish was re-established in 1991. In 2005 the parish was liquidated.

References

Järva County
Former municipalities of Estonia